Luke Steele may refer to:

 Luke Steele (footballer), English football goalkeeper
 Luke Steele (musician), singer-songwriter in Australian duos The Sleepy Jackson and Empire of the Sun